Tickanetley Creek is a stream in the U.S. state of Georgia. It is a tributary to the Cartecay River.

Tickanetley Creek takes its name from the former Cherokee village of Tickanetley, Georgia. Variant names are "Ticanetlee Creek", "Tickanetly Creek", and "Tickenetly Creek".

References

Rivers of Georgia (U.S. state)
Rivers of Gilmer County, Georgia